Rencontre West was a village located northeast of Ramea, Newfoundland and Labrador. The population was 186 in 1956.

See also
List of communities in Newfoundland and Labrador

Ghost towns in Newfoundland and Labrador